Colonel Sir Edward Talbot Thackeray  (19 October 1836 – 3 September 1927) was an English recipient of the Victoria Cross, the highest and most prestigious award for gallantry in the face of the enemy that can be awarded to British and Commonwealth forces.

The son of Rev. Francis Thackeray and Mary Anne Shakespear, he was the first cousin of the novelist, William Makepeace Thackeray. He was educated at Marlborough College and Addiscombe Military Seminary.

Thackeray was 20 years old, and a second lieutenant in the Bengal Engineers, Bengal Army during the Indian Mutiny when the following deed took place on 16 September 1857 at Delhi, British India for which he was awarded the Victoria Cross 

He later achieved the rank of colonel, and was elected to the Athenaeum in 1876. Thackeray retired from the Army in 1888 and in 1898 he went to live in Italy where he spent the rest of his life.

His medal is currently displayed at the National Museum of Military History in Johannesburg, South Africa.

Works
 Biographical notices of officers of the Royal (Bengal) engineers; (1900)

References and sources
References

Sources
Monuments to Courage (David Harvey, 1999)
The Register of the Victoria Cross (This England, 1997)
The Sapper VCs (Gerald Napier, 1998)

External links
 Profile, remuseum.org.uk. Accessed 2 December 2022. 
 

1836 births
1927 deaths
British recipients of the Victoria Cross
Graduates of Addiscombe Military Seminary
British Indian Army officers
Knights Commander of the Order of the Bath
Indian Rebellion of 1857 recipients of the Victoria Cross
People from Broxbourne
People educated at Marlborough College
British military personnel of the Second Anglo-Afghan War
Royal Engineers officers
Bengal Engineers officers
Edward